Tracy Piggott (born 1966) is a British-born former jockey and broadcaster, best known for her work commentating on horse racing on Irish state broadcaster RTÉ.

Early life
Piggott is the daughter of Susan Armstrong and champion jockey Lester Piggott and member of an English family which has been involved in horse racing since the eighteenth century. Her great-grandfather Ernest Piggott won the Grand National as a jockey three times, in 1912, 1918 and 1919, while her grandfather Keith Piggott won the Grand National as a trainer in 1963. Piggott has a sister, ex-eventer Maureen, and a half-brother, Jamie. She has one daughter, Thea, born in 2007.

Career
On leaving school, Piggott first worked as a "galloper" (Also known as Exercise rider or work rider) for horse trainers in the US before moving to Ireland in 1986. There she worked as an assistant to horse trainer Tommy Stack and also competed as a jockey at several meets. Since 1989, she has worked as a broadcaster with RTÉ. She has concentrated primarily on horse racing commentating, but has also anchored the coverage for three Olympic Games, the Special Olympics and the Paralympics, and has been a pitch-side reporter for rugby internationals and Heineken Cup matches. In the late 1990s, she was the presenter on the flagship sports programme Sports Stadium.

Piggott has also worked on other television programmes — narrating the documentary The Young Prince of Ballydoyle, presenting the sports quiz At the End of the Day, and hosting the retrospective The Sporting Year.

She is a member of the Irish Sports Council, and has carried out work for several charities such as the John Durcan Leukaemia Trust, the National Council for the Blind and Playing for Life.

In 2008, she appeared on The Restaurant, while in 2013 she was a contestant on Celebrity MasterChef Ireland, and was the third contestant to be eliminated.

Personal life
Piggott has faced some high-profile personal difficulties. Her father was convicted of tax evasion in the late 1980s. In late 2010, she took out an injunction against a former fiancé, Stephen Mahon, alleging that he had spread malicious falsehoods about her. Mahon had previously been convicted of animal cruelty.

References

External links
 

Living people
RTÉ television presenters
1966 births
British female jockeys
British women television presenters